Richard J. Niehaus (October 24, 1892 – March 12, 1957) was a Major League Baseball pitcher who played for four seasons. He played for the St. Louis Cardinals from 1913 to 1915 and the Cleveland Indians in 1920.

External links

1892 births
1957 deaths
St. Louis Cardinals players
Cleveland Indians players
Major League Baseball pitchers
Baseball players from Kentucky
Sportspeople from Covington, Kentucky
St. Paul Saints (AA) players
Sacramento Senators players
Waynesboro Villagers players
Reading Aces players
Atlanta Crackers players
Minneapolis Millers (baseball) players
Birmingham Barons players
Danville Veterans players
Rochester Tribe players
Macon Peaches players
Spartanburg Spartans players
Battle Creek Crickets players